Endohyalina is a genus of 10 species of corticolous lichens in the family Caliciaceae. The genus was circumscribed by Bernhard Marbach in 2000, with Endohyalina rappii designated as the type species.

Species
Endohyalina arachniformis  (2015) – Australia
Endohyalina brandii  (2010)
Endohyalina circumpallida  (2000)
Endohyalina diederichii  (2010)
Endohyalina ericina  (2010)
Endohyalina gillamsensis  (2016) – Australia
Endohyalina insularis  (2010)
Endohyalina interjecta  (2010)
Endohyalina kalbii  (2010)
Endohyalina rappii  (2000)

References

Caliciales
Caliciales genera
Lichen genera
Taxa described in 2000